The Royal Armoured Corps or Kor Armor Diraja (KAD) is the armoured forces of the Malaysian Army.

The Royal Malaysian Armoured Corps have had its beginning with two army units formed by the British Administration headed by General Sir Gerald Templer who had initiated the formation during the Malayan Emergency. On 1 September 1952, the 1st Battalion Federation Regiment (Affiliated to Royal Irish Fusiliers) and the Federation Armoured Car Regiment (Affiliated to 13th/18th Royal Hussars (QMO) now known as The Light Dragoons) was also formed. Both regiments were the first multi-racial infantry and armoured units in Malaya.

The Federation Regiment and The Federation Armoured Car Regiment were merged on 1 January 1960 to form the Federation Reconnaissance Corps. Both units were equipped with scout cars namely the Ferret scout car, Daimler scout car and other British made armoured cars.

Malayan Special Force in Congo

Both 1 Recce and 2 Recce served with the Malayan Special Force (MSF) under UN Command in the Congo. For its sterling service, the Regiment was given its Royal colours on 23 March 1963. With the formation of Malaysia, the regiment once again was renamed the Malaysian Reconnaissance Regiment. The 3rd Reconnaissance Regiment was formed by merging the 1st Independent Reconnaissance Squadron with the  “D”  Squadrons from 1 Recce and 2 Recce. The regiment was bestowed the “Royal” title on 20 May 1972, and thence called Royal Reconnaissance Regiment.

With the re-alignment of its role and equipment, the regiment changed its name to Royal Cavalry Corps on 22 September 1979, and in 1986 was again renamed Royal Armoured Corps.

Armoured Squadron (Para)
A specialised Parachute Armoured Squadron was formed on 12 September 1992 to equip the newly establish Rapid Deployment Force (Pasukan Aturgerak Cepat) centred on 10th Brigade Paratroopers. Members of the parachute Armoured Squadron are jump qualified. This squadron is equipped with Alvis Scorpion 90 light tank armed with 90 mm gun.

Armour Training Centre
Armoured warfare training is undertaken at the Armour Training Centre at Sebatang Karah Camp in Port Dickson. Exchanges are made with friendly countries such as The United States, United Kingdom, Australia, France, India and Pakistan.

Ceremonial Mounted Squadron
The formation of the Ceremonial Mounted Squadron (Skuadron Istiadat Berkuda) added another milestone to the history of the Armoured Corps, the national tourism industry and the development of the national equestrian sports. The idea was mooted by then Prime Minister Dato' Seri Mahathir Mohamad. With the formation of this unit, it becomes the third uniformed organisation after the Royal Malaysia Police (PDRM) and Kuala Lumpur City Hall (DBKL).

The Ceremonial Mounted Squadron was officially launched on 13 May 1997 by the then Minister of Defence Dato' Syed Hamid Albar bin Syed Jaafar Albar. On this historical day, the mounted squadron was officially designated as Ceremonial Mounted Squadron, Royal Armoured Corps (SIB). The main camp is in Sungai Buloh, Selangor. With the formation of this unit, it is expected to play a significant roles in all national ceremonial functions involving His Majesty the King (SPB YDP Agong) during the State Opening of Parliament, National Day Parade, Trooping of the Colours for the King's Birthday and state visits by heads of state to Malaysia. Presently, priorities is given to train the horsemen in horse riding and horse handling, parade formalities and to prepare them for the future roles as the mounted palace guards.

The squadron's present strength is 6 officers including a veterinarian and 97 other ranks. The present strength will be increased in the near future in line with the present demand to perform the ceremonial duties at the Istana Negara. A year after the official launching of the unit, on 3 November 1998 the unit undertake its first task as a Mounted Static Guard at the main entrance of the Istana Negara. In the long term, the squadron will be expanded to a regiment which brings all the existing Regalia Group under one command and control. The existing Regalia Group comprises the following:
 Dismounted Lancers Guard
 Sovereign's Escort
 Mounted Escort
 Motorized Escort and Outriders
 Mounted Ceremonial Troop
 Squadron Trumpeters
 Central Band of the Royal Armoured Corps
 Vehicle Section

Generally the uniform worn by the horsemen has some similarity with the present dress of the Lancers Guard and the Sovereign Escort. The design of the dress is a continuity of the original ceremonial dress of the Reconnaissance Regiment worn during the formation of the Armoured Corps. The ceremonial jacket of the mounted unit is red in colour with black riding breeches with double gold braide on both sides of the breeches. The dress is specially design for the horsemen to perform duties on horseback armed with the Cavalry Sabre and ceremonial lances. The personnel of the squadron are carefully picked and must comply to the specific criteria laid by the Armoured Directorate. The horses purchased for the squadron is specially selected by the expect, the type and breed must be able to acclimatise the local weather conditions and able to perform specific ceremonial duties with ease. All technical requirement of the horses is clearly mentioned in the General Staff Requirement (GSR) produced by the unit. If motorized, squadron personnel only carry sabres or only use pistols.

The first Officer Commanding of the unit was Major Ahmad Fakharuzi Hj Ibrahim (now a retired Lieutenant Colonel) and the first Squadron Sergeant Major is Warrant Officer 2 Manivanan Nadison. The Motto of the unit is :  (Determined and Excellent) (Pervicax quod Praeclarus). The spirit of the squadron is: Ride to Serve and Proud To Be Above.

The MCS took over the ceremonial role of Horse Guards in the current Istana Negara in 2011.

UNPROFOR and SFOR
Royal Armoured Corps units were a component of the Malaysian contingent under the UNPROFOR and SFOR missions in Bosnia, serving under UN Command and later NATO command. The 3rd Regiment Armour (3 Armor) serving as MALBATT I (Malaysian Battalion I) under UNPROFOR monitored the disarming of the opposing factions and enforcing the ceasefire in Bosnia in 1993. The unit was later relieved by 2nd Regiment Armour (2 Armor) as MALBATT II in 1994–1995. The 4th Regiment Armour (4 Armor) served as MATBATT IV and MALCON I (Malaysian Contingent I) under IFOR. 2 Armor was involved in this Bosnia mission again in 1997. The mission continued until 1998.

Inventory 

5 Armoured Regiments
1 (Mounted) Ceremonial Battalion
 48 - PT-91M Main Battle Tank
 15 - PT-91M based support vehicles:-
6x WZT-4 armoured recovery vehicle
3x MID-M engineering tank
5x PMC Leguan - armoured vehicle-launched bridge
1x SJ-09 driver training tank
267 X ACV 300 of the following variants in service:
 72 IFV with the M2 Browning machine gun in a one-man turret
 31 IFV with the Sharpshooter one-man turret co-developed by FNSS and BAE Systems, armed with a 25mm M242 Bushmaster chain gun
 25 ambulance vehicles
 24 command vehicles
 13 signal vehicles with additional communication equipment
 13 IFV with the Mk 19 grenade launcher in a one-man turret
 10 vehicles armed with an 81 mm mortar
 8 vehicles armed with the Pakistani Baktar Shikan anti-tank guided missile.
 8+7 armoured recovery vehicles

 111 X K200 KIFV
 80 X Bv206 ATVs
 257 X AV8 Gempita FNSS Defence Systems & DefTech (8x8)
 186 X Sibmas 90 AFSV (6x6)
 460 X Radpanzer Condor APC (4x4)

Armour Museum 
The Armoured Corps Museum is located in Sungala Camp, Jalan Sua Betong, Port Dickson, Negeri Sembilan. The late Sultan Mahmud Al-Muktafi Billah Shah Ibni Al-Marhum Al-Sultan Ismail Nasiruddin Shah, the Sultan of Terengganu, launched the museum on 4 September 1993. He was also then the Colonel-in-chief for the Royal Armoured Corps.

The museum aims to store for reference historical documents and artefacts of the Royal Armoured Corps, which has its Corps Home at the 2nd Royal Armoured Regiment, Sunggala Camp, Port Dickson.

Recent news
It celebrated its golden jubilee in 2002 with the Malaysian King and Queen gracing the occasion.

Alliances
  - The Light Dragoons; 2nd Regt

References

External links
 

Malaysia Army corps and regiments
Military units and formations established in 1952
1986 establishments in Malaysia
Malaysian monarchy